Qu Yingpu (born 1965) is a Chinese editor, executive and politician, currently serving as chief editor and president of China Daily.

He is a representative of the 20th National Congress of the Chinese Communist Party and an alternate member of the 20th Central Committee of the Chinese Communist Party.

Biography 
Qu was born in Tanghe County, Henan, in 1965. He successively obtained a bachelor's degree in English language and literature and a bachelor's degree in international journalism from Shanghai International Studies University, and received a master's degree in public administration from Harvard University.

Beginning in 1987, he served in several posts in China Daily, including deputy director of the Economic News Department, director of the Chief Editor's Office, assistant chief editor, chief editor of the Hong Kong Edition of China Daily, and deputy chief editor of China Daily. He rose to become chief editor and president of China Daily in April 2022.

References 

1965 births
Living people
People from Tanghe County
Shanghai International Studies University alumni
Harvard University alumni
People's Republic of China politicians from Henan
Chinese Communist Party politicians from Henan
Alternate members of the 20th Central Committee of the Chinese Communist Party